Calliostoma katoi is a species of sea snail, a marine gastropod mollusk in the family Calliostomatidae.

Some authors place this taxon in the subgenus Calliostoma (Tristichotrochus).

Description
The size of the shell varies between 8 mm and 23 mm.

Distribution
This marine species occurs off Japan.

References

External links
 

katoi
Gastropods described in 1994